Ricardo Diéz, born as Emetério Seledônio Díez (11 February 1900 – 27 April 1971), was a Uruguayan association football coach who mainly worked in Brazil.

Career 
In 1937 Diéz won with provincial Grêmio Foot-Ball Santanense from Santana do Livramento the Campeonato Gaúcho, the only major title in the club's history. In 1942 he also led Internacional, where he was the first foreign coach, to the state title. He is credited at the club for the discovery of the later national team player Nena. In 1941 he was Campeonato Pernambucano runner-up with Sport Recife, where he has been often attributed with the discovery of World Cup 1950 star striker Ademir de Menezes.

Diez, who smoked filterless cigarettes of the Continental brand, is best known for his times with Atlético Mineiro, which he coached on various stints between 1950 and 1960, winning the Campeonato Mineiro in 1949 and 1954. In 1950 he guided Atlético on its successful trip to Central Europe during the northern winter, which became part of the club's folklore and led to its nickname Campeões do Gelo, the "Ice Champions". In total he guided the club in 168 matches, a statistic only outdone by three other coaches, amongst them Telê Santana.

Back to Pernambuco, he became third in the State Championship of 1957 with Náutico, and in 1960 he led Santa Cruz FC to the second place behind Náutico.

Beyond this Diéz also coached other clubs from Minas Gerais: América Mineiro, in 1946, Cruzeiro in 1953, Democrata FC (Sete Lagoas, in 1965, EC Siderúrgica, in 1947, Valeriodoce in 1962 and 1963, and Paraense EC, as well as Santos in São Paulo and Bahia in the state of the same name.

Honours 
Grêmio Santanense
 Campeonato Gaúcho: 1937
Internacional
 Campeonato Gaúcho: 1942
Atlético Mineiro
 Campeonato Mineiro: 1949, 1954

External links 
 O Canto do Galo: Ricardo Diéz (I)
 O Canto do Galo: Ricardo Diéz (II)

References 

People from Rivera Department
Uruguayan football managers
Brazilian football managers
1900 births
1971 deaths
Expatriate football managers in Colombia
América Futebol Clube (MG) managers
America Football Club (RJ) managers
Sport Club do Recife managers
Sport Club Internacional managers
Santos FC managers
Clube Atlético Mineiro managers
Cruzeiro Esporte Clube managers
Esporte Clube Bahia managers
Clube Náutico Capibaribe managers
Santa Cruz Futebol Clube managers
Valeriodoce Esporte Clube managers
Unión Magdalena managers
Democrata Futebol Clube managers